The Fernley Hills are a mountain range southeast of Fernley in Lyon County, Nevada. Temperatures in this mountain range average summer highs around 94 degrees and winter lows around 23 degrees.

References 

Mountain ranges of Nevada
Mountain ranges of the Great Basin
Mountain ranges of Lyon County, Nevada